Volosyanka is an inhabited locality in Ukraine and it may refer to:

 Volosyanka, Skole Raion, a village in Skole Raion, Lviv Oblast
 Volosyanka, Velykyi Bereznyi Raion, a village in Velykyi Bereznyi Raion, Zakarpattia Oblast

See also
 Mala Volosyanka, village in Turka Raion, Lviv Oblast